Oxygen is a 2009 Russian musical drama film directed by Ivan Vyrypaev.

Plot 
The film tells about a young guy Sasha, who walks along the boulevard. Around him are different people who are busy with their own affairs. And suddenly he saw a beautiful red-haired girl who became pure oxygen for him, without which he can no longer live.

Cast 
 Aleksey Filimonov
 Karolina Gruszka
 Varvara Voetskova

References

External links 
 

2009 films
2000s Russian-language films
Russian musical drama films
2000s musical drama films